Melanopsis buccinoidea is a species of freshwater snail in the family Melanopsidae. It is native to the Mediterranean Basin, where it occurs in Jordan, Israel, Palestine, Lebanon, Syria, Cyprus, and southern Turkey.

This is a common species that "can occur in huge numbers". It lives in many kinds of freshwater habitat, such as streams, springs, and irrigation ditches.

There are several subspecies.

References

External links
 Fauna Europaea

Melanopsidae
Gastropods described in 1801